The Calcutta International Exhibition world's fair was held in Calcutta (now Kolkata) from the end of 1883 to March 1884.

Summary
The fair was held between 4 December 1883 and 10 March 1884. and took place in the grounds of the Indian Museum and the Maidan.

There were contributions from Belgium, Ceylon, France, Germany, Italy, Japan, Straits, Turkey and U.S.A. The Australian colonies of New South Wales, South Australia, Tasmania and Victoria were all hosted on the Indian Museum side of the fair.

The Maidan side of the fair was connected to the Indian Museum by a bridge across the Chowinghee Road (now Jawaharlal Nehru Road). In the Maidan there was an iron building that contained Indian courts, a machinery annex, a military shed and a refreshments room.

Indian Courts
There was a Punjab Court with contents secured by Lockwood Kipling.

The Maharajah of Scindia provided a carved sandstone gateway, the Gwalior Gateway, which after the exhibition was sent in 200 packages to London's Victoria and Albert Museum and then displayed at the Colonial and Indian Exhibition in 1886.

Officials
The fair officials included Augustus Rivers Thompson (president executive committee), S.T.Trevor (vice president of the committee) and Jules Joubert (general manager).

William Trickett was commissioner for New South Wales.

Opening ceremony
The opening talk was by Lord Ripon
and was attended by Governors of Bengal (also president of organising committee), Madras, and Bombay, several maharajas and the Duke and Duchess of Connaught.

The ceremony was boycotted by the Anglo-Indian community in protest at the recently introduced Ilbert Bill, it rained (unusual at that time of year) and the illuminations failed.

See also
 Colonial Exhibition of Semarang

References

External links
 search that retrieves 50 photographs of objects from the exhibition

1880s disestablishments in India
1883 establishments in India
1883 in British India
1884 in British India
19th century in Kolkata
World's fairs in India